Lionel Washington (born October 21, 1960 in New Orleans, Louisiana) is the Defensive Coordinator and Cornerbacks coach of the Southern Jaguars football team since 2018.  He is an American retired cornerback who played fifteen seasons in the National Football League.  Washington attended Tulane University.

Washington was a nickelbacks/cornerbacks coach for the Green Bay Packers from 1999 to 2008. He was let go after a disappointing 2008 season. Before the 2009 season the Oakland Raiders hired him to be their defensive secondary coach. In 2011, Washington became Defensive Backs Coach of the United Football League's Virginia Destroyers.  In 2012, he was named co-Defensive Coordinator of the Tulane Green Wave football team.

Washington is the father of Deron Washington, a professional basketball player who was selected in the second round of the 2008 NBA Draft.

References

1960 births
Living people
African-American players of American football
American football cornerbacks
Tulane Green Wave football players
St. Louis Cardinals (football) players
Los Angeles Raiders players
Denver Broncos players
Oakland Raiders players
Green Bay Packers coaches
Oakland Raiders coaches
Virginia Destroyers coaches
Tulane Green Wave football coaches
People from Lutcher, Louisiana
American football
20th-century African-American sportspeople
Ed Block Courage Award recipients